was a Japanese three-member girl group formed in 2008 by the Amuse talent agency. The group performed songs for the anime Zettai Karen Children for the duration of the show.

History
Karen Girl's was formed from elementary school children as a result of an audition. It was represented by the Amuse talent agency, and released its records on the Geneon Universal Entertainment Japan record label. The group was introduced as "a little sister" to the girl trio Perfume. Karen Girl's sang several theme songs for the anime Zettai Karen Children, and became inactive after the series ended. In 2010, Ayami and Suzuka became founding members of Sakura Gakuin, an idol group formed by the same agency. Yuika became a member of the idol group Maboroshi Love.

Suzuka became a founding member of the metal idol band Babymetal, taking the stage name Su-metal. With her new band, she performed a cover of the band's debut single "Over the Future",  rearranged as a heavy metal cover subtitled "Rising Force ver.", at the show Legend "D" Su-metal Seitansai at Akasaka Blitz on 20 December 2012, the same day as her fifteenth birthday.

Members

Discography

Studio albums

Singles

Notes

References

External links 
 Karen Girl's on the Amuse website (Archived from the original on 29 April 2009)
 Karen Girl's profile on the Natalie website
 Article about Karen Girl's "Over the Future" - Barks

Japanese pop music groups
Japanese girl groups
Japanese-language singers
Musical groups established in 2008
2008 establishments in Japan
Universal Music Japan artists
Child musical groups
Musical groups from Tokyo
Anime musical groups